Central Avenue may refer to:

Roads
 Central Avenue (Albany, New York) in Albany, New York
 Central Avenue (Albuquerque, New Mexico) in Albuquerque, New Mexico, part of Historic Route 66
 Central Avenue (Augusta, Georgia), in Augusta, Georgia
 Central Avenue (Baltimore) in Baltimore, Maryland
 Central Avenue (Hudson Palisades), New Jersey
 Central Avenue (Los Angeles) in Los Angeles, California
 Central Avenue Historic District (Hot Springs, Arkansas)
 New York State Route 100 from southern tip of the route to White Plains, in Westchester County, New York
 Minnesota State Highway 65 is known as Central Avenue in Minneapolis and some northern suburbs
 Central Avenue Corridor in Phoenix, Arizona, United States
 Central Avenue, or Chittaranjan Avenue, in Kolkata, India

Other uses
"Central Avenue" (song), a 2012 song by Bobby Womack